The Royal Automobile Club of Queensland Limited (RACQ) is a mutual organisation and Queensland’s largest Club, providing services including roadside assistance, insurance, banking and travel to its approximately 1.75 million members.

RACQ is the largest provider of car insurance in Queensland and the second largest provider of home insurance.

The Club's bimonthly magazine, The Road Ahead, is Queensland’s highest circulating magazine, with 836,995 printed copies and 410,584 digital copies distributed each edition. An earlier journal of the RACQ was the long-running Steering Wheel (1915-1932) which profiled makes of cars and motoring personalities, and carried anecdotes of pioneering days, humorous stories, social gossip, as well as supplementary lists of Registrations.

In financial year 2020, the Club returned $167.1 million to members including $8.6 million in fuel discounts and $5.6 million in theme park, attraction and movie ticket discounts. RACQ provides free-of-charge road safety education programs to primary and secondary school students across the state.

RACQ is a member of the Australian Automobile Association.

History
Eighteen motorists formed the Automobile Club of Queensland in 1905 at a meeting of "almost all the motorists in Brisbane" which was held at the School of Arts, in Ann Street. The club was formed as an advocacy group, styled after the successful Royal Automobile Club of the United Kingdom. Of the eighteen founding members, ten were medical practitioners. Their belief that "autos" could be a reliable means for visiting patients was used to leverage a more positive image of cars in the public consciousness.

Dr. George Hopkins was voted to be the President, and Dr. Charles Marks was the first Vice-President. At the time of formation there were only 16 registered privately owned motor cars in Queensland.

In recognition of the club's patriotic efforts during the Great War, King George V approved the use of the 'Royal' prefix in 1921.

In 1925 RACQ Roadside Assistance was born when the Club commissioned two mechanics, George Clark and Eddie Henderson, to patrol the roads in search of disabled vehicles.

In the 1970’s the Club began to expand its services including the formation of RACQ Insurance.  

In 2011, following Tropical Cyclone Yasi in Northern Queensland and flooding in central and southern Queensland, RACQ Foundation was launched to assist community groups devastated by natural disasters.

RACQ was inducted into the Queensland Business Leaders Hall of Fame in 2014.

In 2017, RACQ merged with Queensland Teachers Mutual Bank, forming RACQ Bank.

Services
As of 2021, RACQ provides the following services:
 Assistance – roadside assistance and home assistance
 Insurance – motor, home and contents, caravan, boat, pet, travel, life and income protection
 Banking
 Travel Agency

Community and sponsorships

In 2011 RACQ launched RACQ Foundation to assist community groups to recover from natural disasters and drought. In 2020 the Foundation expanded its remit for a short period to include groups hit by COVID-19. Since 2011 the Foundation has awarded more than $9.24 million in grants.

The RACQ Air Rescue Network comprises RACQ Capricorn Rescue, RACQ CQ Rescue and RACQ LifeFlight Rescue helicopters as well as three fixed wing RACQ LifeFlight Rescue Air Ambulance Jets. RACQ has sponsored the network for more than 25 years.  

The RACQ International Women’s Day Fun Run is an annual event that creates awareness of breast cancer among women of all ages. It aims to inspire women and girls and to celebrate their achievements while benefiting Mater Chicks in Pink.

RACQ sponsors the ARTIE Academy Drivers Licence Program, which helps students receive their licence and increase their post-school options. By working with the Former Origin Greats the Academy aims to ‘Close the gap’ in education between indigenous and non-indigenous students throughout Queensland.

RACQ’s Education team present potentially life-saving road safety programs to Queensland students including their award-winning Docudrama program. The team also offer CashIQ – a financial literacy program designed to help year 11 and 12 students to make informed financial choices and looks at how those decisions may affect their long-term goals.

RACQ also holds its annual MotorFest event in Brisbane, where it celebrates the motoring heritage of the past, as well as current and future innovations in transport and vehicle technology.

Locations
The RACQ head offices are in Brisbane at Eight Mile Plains and 60 Edward Street in the CBD. The Club has 19 retail stores throughout the State.

In 2013, RACQ released its Mobile Member Centre (MMC) a “branch on wheels”, the MMC is used for exhibitions and trade shows, when not needed to assist members following large-scale disasters.

References

External links
RACQ
The Steering Wheel. State Library of Queensland 

Transport in Queensland
Automobile Club of Queensland, Royal
1905 establishments in Australia
Automobile associations in Australia
Insurance companies of Australia
Banks of Australia
Emergency road services